Cerambyx scopolii is species of longhorn beetle native to Europe. Its wood-boring larvae will grow in oak, willow, and chestnut, and in sufficient density can kill a tree.

External links

More images

Beetles described in 1775
Taxa named by Johann Kaspar Füssli
Cerambycini